De Akkers is a hollow post mill in Wartena, Friesland, Netherlands which was built in 1970 and has been restored so that it can turn in the wind. It is listed as a Rijksmonument.

History
De Akkers was built in the 18th century. In 1921, it was moved to Snikzwaag, Friesland to replace a tjasker. In 1970, the derelict mill was bought by the Stichting Langebrück, Amsterdam, North Holland. It was moved to Wartena and restored. A similar mill, the Saitermolen, had previously stood on the site. The mill was restored in 1986 by millwright Westra of Franeker, Friesland. The mill is listed as a Rijksmonument, №22934.

Description

De Deels is what the Dutch describe as a Spinnekopmolen. It is a hollow post mill on a single storey roundhouse. The mill is winded by a winch. The sails are Common sails. The sails are carried on a wooden windshaft. The windshaft carries the brake wheel which has 27 cogs. This drives the wallower (15 cogs) at  the top of the upright shaft. The Archimedes' screw is  diameter. It is worked by an electric motor. No other machinery remains.

References

Windmills in Friesland
Windmills completed in 1970
Hollow post mills in the Netherlands
Windpumps in the Netherlands
Agricultural buildings in the Netherlands
Rijksmonuments in Friesland